Puya grafii is a species in the genus Puya. This species is endemic to Venezuela.

References

Puya grafii, a New Dwarf Puya from Southern Venezuela retrieved 30 October 2018

grafii
Flora of Venezuela